Abrell is a surname. Notable people with the surname include:

Brad Abrell (1965–), American actor 
Charles G. Abrell (1931–1951), United States Marine and Medal of Honor recipient
Dick Abrell (1892–1973), American football player
Jakob Abrell (1935–2003), German author

See also
Abell (surname)
Arbell